Edith Clever (born 13 December 1940, in Wuppertal) is a German actress.

Filmography
1976: 
1976: Die  Marquise von O. (Die Marquise von O)
1978: Die linkshändige Frau (The Left-Handed Woman)
1979: Mädchenjahre  (L'Adolescente)
1979: Trilogie des Wiedersehens
1980: Groß und Klein
1982: Parsifal
1985: Die Nacht
1986: Drei Schwestern
1987: Penthesilea
1987: Fräulein Else
1990: Die Marquise von O. 'vom Süden in den Norden verlegt'
1994: Ein Traum, was sonst (A Dream, What Else?)

Awards
1977 – Deutscher Darstellerpreis (Chaplin-Schuh)
1982 – Bayerischer Filmpreis
1988 – Gertrud-Eysoldt-Ring
2006 – Nestroy Theatre Prize

External links
 

1940 births
German film actresses
Living people
Best Actress German Film Award winners
Members of the Academy of Arts, Berlin
Actors from Wuppertal
20th-century German actresses